Onuchin is a Russian masculine surname, its feminine counterpart is Onuchina. The surname originates from onuchi, a Russian word for puttee.

References

Russian-language surnames